"Natalie" is a Swedish English language song written by Tony Nilsson which he released in 2006 under the name Tony. It was also included in the compilation Absolute Summerhits 2006.

Ola Svensson version

Ola Svensson released a hugely successful cover version under the name Ola. The song served as the lead single from his second album Good Enough and became a big summer hit in 2007, topping the Swedish Singles Chart for 6 weeks, namely charts dated 28 June and 5 July 2007 (first run), 26 July and 5 August 2007 (second run) and 16 and 23 August 2007 (third run). The single was certified platinum in Sweden, in recognition of 20,000 copies sold.

Charts

See also
"Unstoppable (The Return of Natalie)"

References

2006 singles
Number-one singles in Sweden
Ola Svensson songs
Songs written by Tony Nilsson
2006 songs